This is the discography of Canadian rock band, The Tragically Hip. They have released 13 studio albums, one live album, one compilation album, two video albums, two extended plays, and a boxed set.

There is also a series of live albums, sold exclusively through their website under the title "Live from the Vault".

Albums

Studio albums

Compilation albums

Live albums

Box sets

Extended plays

Singles

Other songs
 "Land" (with Crash Vegas, Hothouse Flowers, Midnight Oil and Daniel Lanois)
 "Oh Honey" (Men with Brooms (soundtrack) - 2002)
 "Ultra Mundane" (In Violet Light digital download – 2002)
 "Problem Bears" (In Violet Light digital download – 2002)
 "Forest Edge" (In Violet Light digital download – 2002)
 "Black Day in July" (Beautiful: A Tribute to Gordon Lightfoot – 2003)
 "Night Is for Getting" (In Between Evolution iTunes bonus track – 2004)
 "Hush" (We Are the Same iTunes bonus track – 2009)
 "Skeleton Park" (We Are the Same Telus Mobility bonus track – 2009)

Video releases

References

Discographies of Canadian artists
Rock music group discographies
Discography